Eupithecia fredi is a moth   in the family Geometridae. It is found in eastern Afghanistan.

The wingspan is about 18–22.5 mm. The forewings are brownish grey and the hindwings are also brownish grey but lighter than the forewings.

Etymology
This species is named in honour of the German lepidopterologist Fred Brandt.

References

Moths described in 2012
fredi
Moths of Asia